Anohni (formerly Antony Hegarty, born 24 October 1971), styled as ANOHNI, is an English-born singer, songwriter, and visual artist. She was formerly the lead singer of the band Antony and the Johnsons.

Anohni was born in Chichester, England. Her family moved to the San Francisco Bay Area in 1981. In 1990, she moved to Manhattan, New York to study at the Experimental Theater Wing at New York University, and in 1992 she founded the performance art collective Blacklips with Johanna Constantine.

She started her musical career performing with an ensemble of NYC musicians as Antony and the Johnsons. Their first album, Antony and the Johnsons, was released in 2000 on David Tibet's label Durtro. Their second album, I Am a Bird Now (2005), was a commercial and critical success, earning her the Mercury Music Prize.

In 2016, Anohni became the first openly transgender performer nominated for an Academy Award; she was nominated for the Academy Award for Best Original Song, along with J. Ralph, for the song "Manta Ray" in the film Racing Extinction. Her debut solo album, Hopelessness, was released in May 2016 to wide critical acclaim, including another nomination for the Mercury Music Prize and a Brit Award. In 2022, she collaborated with Hercules and Love Affair and sang on half of the album In Amber which was released in June. In 2023, Rolling Stone ranked Anohni at number 192 on its list of the 200 Greatest Singers of All Time.

Early life 
Anohni was born in 1971 in Chichester, England. She identified as transgender from an early age. In 1977, her family moved to Amsterdam for a year, and then, in 1981, they moved to the San Francisco Bay Area of California, settling in San Jose, where Anohni attended Lincoln High School and studied music and was an avid record collector. Her favourite artists included Orchestral Manoeuvres in the Dark (OMD), Kate Bush, Culture Club, Alison Moyet and Marc and the Mambas. Anohni said of OMD's albums Architecture & Morality (1981) and Dazzle Ships (1983), "Those records, they really changed me when I was a kid. I'd never heard anything quite like it."

In 1990, Anohni moved to Manhattan to attend the Experimental Theatre Wing of New York University. In 1992 she founded the performance collective Blacklips, later known as Blacklips Performance Cult, with creative partner Johanna Constantine, and she spent the next several years singing in after-hours bars and clubs using pre-recorded cassettes as self-accompaniment as well as writing and directing late-night theatre productions.

Musical career

Antony and the Johnsons 

After being awarded a grant from New York Foundation for the Arts for the 1996 production of "The Birth of Anne Frank/The Ascension of Marsha P. Johnson" at Performance Space 122, Anohni solicited accompanying musicians to record a number of songs she wrote in the early 1990s. The ensemble performed for the first time as "Antony and the Johnsons" at The Kitchen as part of William Basinski's installation "Life on Mars" in 1997. In 1999, the group began to perform more frequently at venues such as Joe's Pub and The Knitting Factory in New York City. British experimental musician David Tibet of Current 93 heard the recording and offered to release it through his Durtro record label; the debut album, Antony and the Johnsons, was released in 2000. In 2001, Anohni released a follow-up EP through Durtro, I Fell in Love with a Dead Boy, which, in addition to the title track, included a cover of a David Lynch/Angelo Badalamenti song "Mysteries of Love", and a Current 93 song, "Soft Black Stars".

Antony and the Johnsons' 2005 album I Am a Bird Now featured guest performances by Lou Reed, Boy George, Rufus Wainwright and Devendra Banhart. The album was released in North America by Secretly Canadian Records and in Europe by Rough Trade. It won the UK's Mercury Prize and was named Album of the Year by Mojo magazine. The band toured North America, Europe, Australia and parts of South America for a year and a half in support of I am a Bird Now. The song "Bird Gerhl" was featured in the soundtrack for the movie V for Vendetta.

Antony and the Johnsons collaborated with experimental film maker Charles Atlas and presented TURNING in Nov 2006 in Rome, London, Paris, Madrid, and Braga, Portugal. The concert featured live video portraits of a group of women from the New York City underground. The Guardian called the piece "fragile, life affirming, and truly wonderful (five stars)" Le Monde in Paris hailed TURNING as "Concert-manifeste transsexuel."

In 2007, Anohni created an original soundtrack for a video by Nick Knight featuring the designs of Hussein Chalayan. She collaborated in 2008 with Prada to create a song called "The Great White Ocean" for their promotional campaign.

Antony and the Johnsons' 5-song Another World EP was released on 7 October 2008. Antony and the Johnsons' third album, The Crying Light, was released on 19 January 2009. The album peaked at number 1 on the European Billboard charts. Anohni has described the theme of the album as being "about landscape and the future." The album was mixed by Bryce Goggin and includes arrangements by Nico Muhly. Ann Powers wrote of The Crying Light for the LA Times online, "it's the most personal environmentalist statement possible, making an unforeseen connection between queer culture's identity politics and the green movement. As music, it's simply exquisite – more controlled and considered than anything Antony and the Johnsons have done and sure to linger in the minds of listeners."
After touring throughout North America and Europe in support of their new album, Antony and the Johnsons presented a unique staging of "The Crying Light" with the Manchester Camerata at the Manchester Opera House for the 2009 Manchester International Festival. The concert hall was transformed with laser effects created by installation artist Chris Levine. Antony and the Johnsons have gone on to present concerts with symphonies across Europe in Summer 2009, including the Opera Orchestra of Lyon, the Metropole Orchestra, Roma Sinfonietta and the Montreux Jazz Festival Orchestra. At Salle Pleyel in Paris, Anohni appeared in a costume designed by Riccardo Tisci of Givenchy.

Fall 2010 saw the release of Thank You for Your Love EP and in October the full-length album Swanlights on Secretly Canadian and Rough Trade. Abrams Books also published a book edition of Swanlights featuring Anohni's drawings and collages with photography by Don Felix Cervantes. At the end of October Anohni performed a special concert in New York City at Lincoln Center to commemorate the life of Kazuo Ohno who had died in June 2010.

In January 2011, Anohni was a guest on Wintergasten, a program on Dutch Television's VPRO channel and was interviewed by Leon Verdonschot discussing her political and ecological viewpoints in reference to different film clips.

Anohni performed at the TED conference in Long Beach in 2011 in a session on "Radical Collaboration".

During the 2011 Manchester International Festival Anohni was musical director for The Life and Death of Marina Abramović, a biography of the 'Godmother' of performance art, re-imagined by director Robert Wilson and co-starring Willem DaFoe, Marina Abramović and Anohni. The piece has subsequently been staged in Madrid, Amsterdam, Antwerp, Basel, Toronto (as part of the Luminato Festival) and NYC.

In January 2012, Antony and the Johnsons were presented by the Museum of Modern Art at Radio City Music Hall in "Swanlights", a collaboration with laser artist Chris Levine and set designer Carl Robertshaw. The performance was described by The New York Times in a review by Jon Parales entitled "Cries From the heart, Crashing Like Waves." This collaboration was also staged at the Royal Opera House in London in 2013 and at Teatro Real in Madrid in 2014.

Antony and the Johnsons released a live symphonic album in August 2012 entitled Cut the World featuring the Danish Radio Orchestra. The album features a spoken track called "Future Feminism" in which Anohni elaborates on her view of the connection between feminism and ecology. A video for the song "Cut the World" directed by Nabil features Willem Dafoe, Carice van Houten and Marina Abramović.

Anohni was the curator of Meltdown 2012 at the Southbank Centre in London.

Anohni was "guest of honor" at the Melbourne Festival in October 2012, presenting a restaging of "Swanlights", as well as screening Charles Atlas' Turning, Lynette Wallworth's Coral: Rekindling Venus, and presenting Paradise, an exhibition of her drawings and collages.

Anohni performed with orchestra for the 2013 Spring Givenchy collection in Paris, singing You Are My Sister and expanding on the theme of Future Feminism in literature distributed at the event.

In June 2015, Antony and the Johnsons performed at Dark Mofo in Tasmania as a benefit in support of the Martu people of Parnngurr in Western Australia in their fight to prevent a uranium mine from being developed near their community by Canadian multinational Cameco and Mitsubishi. Anohni appeared with Martu representatives at a press conference at the MCA in Sydney and on ABC's "Q and A" in further service of this cause.

Anohni collaborated with composer J. Ralph on the song "Manta Ray" from the environmental documentary Racing Extinction. The song received a nomination for Best Original Song at the 88th Academy Awards. Anohni released a statement expressing discomfort over the academy's decision to characterize her in the days leading up to the ceremony as having been "cut" from the line-up due to "time constraints", despite never actually having been asked to perform in the first place. She stated that "singing about eco-cide... might not sell advertising space" and that the system is one "of social oppression and diminished opportunities for transpeople that has been employed by capitalism in the U.S. to crush our dreams and our collective spirit". She did not attend the event.

Anohni 

On 23 February 2015, Anohni announced her fifth album Hopelessness via the Antony and the Johnsons' website and Facebook account. Co-produced by Anohni, Oneohtrix Point Never and Hudson Mohawke, it was her first album to be released under her name Anohni, one that she had been using in her personal life "for years". In the announcement, Anohni described the album as "an electronic record with some sharp teeth" and the UK's Independent described it as a "bitterly beautiful record". On 30 November 2015, Anohni released "4 Degrees", the first song from Hopelessness. Commenting on the album's lead single in a fan interview earlier in the year, Anohni had stated that she had "grown tired of grieving for humanity", adding that she felt she "was not being entirely honest by pretending that I am not a part of the problem. '4 Degrees' is kind of a brutal attempt to hold myself accountable, not just valorize my intentions but also reflect on the true impact of my behaviors."

On 9 March 2016, Anohni premiered the album's second single "Drone Bomb Me" on Annie Mac's show on BBC Radio 1 later that day, accompanied by a music video directed by Nabil Elderkin and starring English supermodel Naomi Campbell. The video Hopelessness was released on 6 May 2016 and was nominated for the 2016 Mercury Prize and a Brit. Anohni toured throughout Europe, the US and Australia in 2016, performing with her face obscured under a veil throughout the concert, in front of stark projections of a series of lip-synching women. The confrontational performance was described by The New York Times as a combination of "hard-core punk" and "radical empathy that's hard to find anywhere in pop." In early 2017 she went on to release a further EP entitled PARADISE, working with the same producers. The final track was awarded only to those who wrote to ANOHNI's email with "...a sentence or two what you care most about, or your hopes for the future. Send this to me instead of the dollar you used to send me in the olden days."

In 2018, for the occasion of her exhibition at Nikolaj Kunsthal in Copenhagen, Anohni released the track "Miracle Now" on YouTube, which features a video of 1990s NYC transgender performance artist Page Reynolds, featured in The Johnsons' play MIRACLE NOW of 1996 as "The Last Dolphin."

In 2020 Anohni released a single "It's All Over Now, Baby Blue" by Bob Dylan and "Be My Husband", originally by Nina Simone. In the days after that year's Republican National Convention she released a protest single via YouTube called "R.N.C. 2020" with an accompanying essay published in The Guardian

In October 2021 Anohni scored the multidisciplinary artists collective Drift's sculptural installation Fragile Future at The Shed. In January 2022 Anohni scored the Valentino Spring fashion show "Anatomy of Couture".

Musical collaborations 
In addition to Antony and the Johnsons, Anohni occasionally collaborates with other musicians. In 2003, she began working with Lou Reed as a supporting vocalist on the Animal Serenade tour and performed on a number of tracks on Reed's album The Raven. She sang back up (with Sharon Jones and a children's choir) in Lou Reed's first full performance of his album Berlin at St Ann's Warehouse in NYC in December 2006 and at The State Theatre in Sydney, Australia in January 2007. Anohni sang "If It Be Your Will" as a part of Hal Willner's Came So Far For Beauty concerts at the Sydney Opera House in 2005; this performance was later featured in the film Leonard Cohen: I'm Your Man, a tribute to Leonard Cohen.

In 2006, she collaborated with Icelandic musician Björk in recording sessions in Jamaica and Iceland. The songs, "The Dull Flame of Desire" and "My Juvenile" were featured on her 2007 album Volta. The two also sang the songs in duet at several of Björk's concerts, including London, Reykjavík and New York. In 2015 Anohni sang for Björk again on Vulnicura's "Atom Dance".

Also in 2006 she co-produced Songs from the Coalmine Canary by Little Annie, also playing piano, singing backup vocals, and co-writing several songs on the album. The song "Strangelove", co-written by Anohni and Little Annie, was used as the soundtrack for Levi's "Dangerous Liaisons" advertising campaign in 2007, garnering several awards, including the Cannes Lions – International Advertising Festival, 2007 (Bronze Lion) for "Best Use of Music".

In 2008, Anohni was featured on five tracks from the self-titled disco album Hercules and Love Affair, most notably on "Blind", which was voted best track of 2008 by Pitchfork Media and ranked at number 2 on the "10 Best Singles of 2008" list by American magazine Entertainment Weekly.

Anohni worked with Bernard Butler on some acoustic sessions for the radio station XFM. In June 2009, she appeared live with Yoko Ono and the Plastic Ono Band at Ornette Coleman's Meltdown at the Royal Festival Hall, singing Ono's "Toyboat". In the same year, she collaborated with Bryce Dessner on the Bob Dylan song "I Was Young When I Left Home" for the AIDS benefit album Dark Was the Night, produced by the Red Hot Organization.

On 2 September 2013 she performed at the Verona Arena with the Italian musician and songwriter Franco Battiato. From the concert, in the following month of November, the live album Del suo veloce volo, published by Universal, is taken.

In 2017, Anohni appeared on Cocorosie's politically charged single Smoke 'em Out" with Big Freedia, Cakes da Killa and others.

In June 2022, Anohni appeared on Hercules and Love Affair's album In Amber. She took the lead on six tracks including the singles "Poisonous Storytelling", and "One". She co-composed six songs present on the record and also collaborated with drummer Budgie of Siouxsie and the Banshees and the Creatures who is one of her influences.

Visual art and performance 
In July 2008, Anohni debuted a number of self-produced visual artworks in a Brussels exhibition curated by Jerome Sans. Working with longtime collaborator/photographer Don Felix Cervantes and adviser Joie Iacono, she went on to have solo exhibitions at Isis Gallery in London and Accademia Albertina in Turin, Italy.

In April 2009, she curated an exhibition entitled "6 Eyes" at the Agnes B. Galerie Du Jour in Paris. In this exhibition she drew connections between her own work and the work of artists Peter Hujar, Kiki Smith, Barbara Cummard, Alice O'Malley, James Elaine and William Basinski and was the first time the work of Peter Hujar had ever been exhibited in France.

A solo exhibition of Anohni's drawings and sculptures opened at the Hammer Museum in Los Angeles in January 2012.

A solo exhibition of Anohni's drawings and sculptures opened at Sikkema Jenkins Gallery in NYC in June 2013. Roberta Smith of The New York Times said of the show "Sometimes talent is concentrated, sometimes it spans multiple mediums. That of Anohni, singer-songwriter and leading light of the musical group Antony and the Johnsons, is the spanning kind. She is also a serious visual artist. Her first solo show in New York follows exhibitions in Los Angeles and London, and introduces a sensibility that is consistent with her heart-rending songs and warbling delivery: fragile, falling apart but surviving, even defiant."

A further exhibition that included Anohni's drawings opened in September 2014 at Sikkemma Jenkins gallery in NYC.

Collaborating with Johanna Constantine, Kembra Pfahler, and Bianca and Sierra Casady, Anohni co-presented the exhibition and performance series "FUTURE FEMINISM" at The Hole in NYC in September 2014. Thirteen rose quartz sculptures were displayed during the 2-week event series, and artists including Lorraine O'Grady, Lydia Lunch, Kiki Smith, Marina Abramović, Terence Koh and Narcissister made presentations.

In Autumn 2016, Anohni presented "My Truth", the largest exhibition of her work to date, across seven rooms at the Kunsthalle Bielefeld in Germany. On the first and second floors of the museum, Anohni also curated work by Peter Hujar, Kazuo Ohno and James Elaine.

Anohni was artist-in-residence at European Capital of Culture, Aarhus 2017. In August she co-presented FUTURE FEMINISM at 'O' Space in Aarhus with Kembra Pfahler and Johanna Constantine. The program featured 25 lectures, performances and workshops, including a presentations by FEMEN and Victoria Kawesa from the Feminist Party of Sweden, Kembra Pfahler's "Performance Art 101" and a course in self-defense.

Anohni presented a multimedia exhibition at Nikolaj Kunsthal in Copenhagen opening in May 2018. The installation includes a collection of framed newspaper articles on the traumatic passing of Marsha P. Johnson, global warming and the melting polar icecap, the beginnings of the AIDS crisis, and cold war nuclear waste disposal. A series of nine archival video loops revisit Anohni's 1996 production "Miracle Now" with her NYC performance group The Johnsons, featuring performers and collaborators including Dr. Julia Yasuda, Johanna Constantine, Page, Lavinia Co-op, and Amanda Lepore. Another gallery contains archives and visual materials from her work as a playwright and director in the NYC experimental theater and nightclub scene during the 1990s. Three further galleries contain assemblies of Anohni's paintings, sculptures, and videos.

In April 2019, Anohni mounted an exhibition entitled "LOVE" at The Kitchen in New York City. She wrote of the exhibition in the program, "We face grave uncertainty about the existence of a future. Can we reorganize our compulsion to cut the throat of nature? I keep asking myself, 'What Is Really Happening?' The same illness infecting the biosphere has grown around the systems that support my own contemporary life, and a bloom of hopelessness opened up in me. I think about holding space for vanishing, of people, of communities, of biodiversity, in a way that opens into spectral time, leaking all points at once". In part a memorial for her longtime collaborator Julia Yasuda, Anohni published a book of photos by Julia's wife, Erika Yasuda, to coincide with the event. Anohni also staged a play entitled "She Who Saw Beautiful Things" which included performances by Charles Atlas, Lorraine O'Grady, Connie Flemming, Laurie Anderson, and others.

Personal life 

Anohni is transgender and uses the pronouns she/her. In an interview with Flavorwire in November 2014, she stated, "My closest friends and family use feminine pronouns for me. I have not mandated the press [to] do one thing or another... In my personal life I prefer 'she'. I think words are important. To call a person by their chosen gender is to honor their spirit, their life and contribution. 'He' is an invisible pronoun for me; it negates me."

Discography 
With Antony and the Johnsons
 Antony and the Johnsons (2000)
 I Am a Bird Now (2005)
 The Crying Light (2009)
 Swanlights (2010)
 Cut the World (live) (2012)
 Del suo veloce volo (live with Franco Battiato) (2013)
 Turning (live DVD and soundtrack) (2014)

As Anohni
 Hopelessness (2016)
 Paradise EP (2017)

Awards and nominations 
{| class=wikitable
|-
! Year !! Awards !! Work !! Category !! Result
|-
|2005
| Mercury Prize
| I Am a Bird Now
| Album of the Year
| 
|-
|2006
| Brit Awards
| Herself
| British Male Solo Artist
| 
|-
| rowspan=2|2008
| UK Music Video Awards
| rowspan=2|"Blind" (with Hercules and Love Affair)
| Best Pop Video – UK
| 
|-
| Best Art Vinyl
| Best Vinyl Art
| 
|-
| 2011
| New York Music Awards
| Herself
| Best Alternative Male Vocalist
| 
|-
| rowspan=7|2016
| Academy Awards
| "Manta Ray"
| Best Original Song
| 
|-
| Mercury Prize
| Hopelessness
| Album of the Year
| 
|-
| rowspan=5|Rober Awards Music Poll
| rowspan=3|Herself
| Best Female Artist
| 
|-
| Best Live Artist
| 
|-
| Best Pop Artist
| 
|-
| "4 Degrees"
| Song of the Year
| 
|-
| rowspan=2|Hopelessness
| Album of the Year
| 
|-
| rowspan=5|2017
| rowspan=3|A2IM Libera Awards
| Best Dance/Electronica Album
| 
|-
| rowspan=2|"Drone Bomb Me"
| Video of the Year
| 
|-
| Video of the Year (Fan Vote)
| 
|-
| Brit Awards
| Herself
| British Female Solo Artist
| 
|-
| Rober Awards Music Poll
| Paradise
| Best EP
| 
|-
| 2018
| Queerty Awards
| Herself
| Musician
|

Other recordings

References

External links 

 – official website

1971 births
Living people
Antony and the Johnsons members
Art pop musicians
English expatriates in the Netherlands
English pop singers
English women singer-songwriters
Feminist musicians
Hercules and Love Affair members
English LGBT songwriters
LGBT people from New York (state)
English LGBT singers
Musicians from Sussex
People from Chichester
Tisch School of the Arts alumni
Transgender artists
Transgender women musicians
English women in electronic music
Transgender singers
Transgender songwriters
American LGBT singers
Secretly Canadian artists
American LGBT songwriters
American transgender writers